So Fresh: The Hits of Spring 2004 is a compilation of songs that were popular in Australia in winter 2004. It was released on 20 September 2004.

Track listing 
 Avril Lavigne – "My Happy Ending" (4:03)
 JC Chasez – "All Day Long I Dream About Sex" (3:36)
 Paulini – "Angel Eyes" (4:03)
 Cosima – "When the War Is Over" (3:46)
 Anastacia – "Sick and Tired" (3:30)
 The Black Eyed Peas – "Let's Get It Started" (3:38)
Usher – "Burn" (4:17)
 Freestylers – "Push Up" (3:56)
 J-Kwon – "Tipsy" (4:06)
 Outkast – "Roses" (4:14)
 Frankee – "F.U.R.B. (Fuck You Right Back)" (3:19)
 Britney Spears – "Everytime" (Hi-Bias Radio Remix) (3:28)
 Jessica Simpson – "Take My Breath Away" (3:14)
 Shannon Noll – "Learn to Fly" (4:12)
 Miranda Murphy – "That Girl" (3:36)
 Rob Mills – "Ms. Vanity" (3:46)
 Kayne Taylor – "Heartbreaker" (3:10)
 Franz Ferdinand – "Take Me Out" (3:58)
 Killing Heidi –"I Am" (3:26)
 Hoobastank – "The Reason" (3:53)

Charts

See also
So Fresh

References

External links
 Official site

So Fresh albums
2004 compilation albums
2004 in Australian music